Benty Grange is a Site of Special Scientific Interest in the parish of Monyash in Derbyshire, England.  in size and with at least four species of grass and ten others of plant, it is considered of national importance as one of the largest areas of  unimproved species-rich neutral lowland grassland in the Peak District National Park. The area was confirmed as a Site of Special Scientific Interest on 8 March 2013, following notification of the designation on 19 June 2012.

Benty Grange is also the site of a large Anglo-Saxon barrow which on 23 October 1970 was listed as a scheduled monument. It was excavated on 3 May 1848 by the English antiquarian Thomas Bateman, who discovered a richly furnished burial which included the Benty Grange helmet. The list entry for the barrow notes that other than this excavation, it is "undisturbed and retains significant archaeological remains."

Description
Benty Grange is a  area of grassland in Monyash parish in Derbyshire, England. It covers eight plots of land tended by two owners, David Woolley and Mark Allen, and partially surrounds the Benty Grange farmhouse. Grasses in the area include Cynosurus cristatus, Anthoxanthum odoratum, Agrostis capillaris, and Festuca rubra; some other plants are Centaurea nigra, Ranunculus acris, Ranunculus bulbosus, Plantago lanceolata, Trifolium pratense, Leucanthemum vulgare, Lotus corniculatus, Hypochaeris radicata, Rumex acetosa, and Conopodium majus.

Notification of the designation as a Site of Special Scientific Interest was made on 19 June 2012. It was confirmed on 8 March 2013, over the objections of Woolley and five other parties in his support.

Barrow

Benty Grange also contains an Anglo-Saxon barrow which was designated a scheduled monument on 23 October 1970. It was excavated on 3 May 1848 by  English antiquarian Thomas Bateman, who discovered the Benty Grange helmet and the Benty Grange hanging bowl among the remains of a richly furnished burial. Historic England notes in the list entry for the barrow, however, that other for than Bateman's excavation the barrow is "undisturbed and retains significant archaeological remains", and that further investigation would return new information.

References

Bibliography
 
 
 
 
 
  
 

Anglo-Saxon sites in England
Sites of Special Scientific Interest in Derbyshire
Scheduled monuments in Derbyshire